The Jewish Big Sisters was a communal organization offering support to Jewish children arraigned in the Children's Courts of New York City. Established in 1912, it was an outgrowth of the Big Brothers Big Sisters movement (established in 1902) which sought to provide mentorship to boys (and eventually girls) who had gone through the Children's Courts. As more Jewish boys and girls found their way into the court system, support materialized for the formation of organizations first for boys and then for girls with the aim of preventing delinquency.

The Jewish Big Sisters was founded by Mrs. Sidney C. Borg, who as a volunteer in Children's Court lamented the lack of qualified staff to deal with growing numbers of girls she found in court. She established the organization with the recruitment of six volunteers to help deal with individuals cases. The work of the Jewish Big Sisters involved visits to the home of the individual "little sister" in cooperation with the central office in order to work on specific cases. A professional would make preliminary visits and at the appropriate time, a big sister would be assigned to the individual. Frequent reports on progress were required. By 1917, the organization had a staff of 250.

Borg also lobbied for legislation to aid children. At a 40th anniversary celebration in 1952, she promoted concern about the designation of "delinquent," pointing out that the term implied conviction of a felony although the individuals may not have been convicted of any crime. She also noted that, when she first started, children were classified as either "good" or "bad" but that now they were called "sick."

See also 
Big Brothers Big Sisters of New York City
Big Brothers Big Sisters (disambiguation)

References 

Mentorships
Organizations established in 1912
Youth empowerment organizations
Jewish organizations
1912 establishments in New York City